Borisovsky (masculine), Borisovskaya (feminine), or Borisovskoye (neuter) is the name of several  rural localities in Russia.

Altai Krai
As of 2010, one rural locality in Altai Krai bears this name:
Borisovsky, Altai Krai, a settlement in Krasnoarmeysky Selsoviet of Pankrushikhinsky District

Arkhangelsk Oblast
As of 2010, eight rural localities in Arkhangelsk Oblast bear this name:
Borisovskaya, Konoshsky District, Arkhangelsk Oblast, a village in Vadyinsky Selsoviet of Konoshsky District
Borisovskaya, Kotlassky District, Arkhangelsk Oblast, a village in Votlazhemsky Selsoviet of Kotlassky District
Borisovskaya, Krasnoborsky District, Arkhangelsk Oblast, a village in Cherevkovsky Selsoviet of Krasnoborsky District
Borisovskaya, Lensky District, Arkhangelsk Oblast, a village in Lensky Selsoviet of Lensky District
Borisovskaya, Primorsky District, Arkhangelsk Oblast, a village in Zaostrovsky Selsoviet of Primorsky District
Borisovskaya, Velsky District, Arkhangelsk Oblast, a village in Puysky Selsoviet of Velsky District
Borisovskaya, Fedkovsky Selsoviet, Verkhnetoyemsky District, Arkhangelsk Oblast, a village in Fedkovsky Selsoviet of Verkhnetoyemsky District
Borisovskaya, Nizhnetoyemsky Selsoviet, Verkhnetoyemsky District, Arkhangelsk Oblast, a village in Nizhnetoyemsky Selsoviet of Verkhnetoyemsky District

Bryansk Oblast
As of 2010, one rural locality in Bryansk Oblast bears this name:
Borisovsky, Bryansk Oblast, a settlement in Zaulsky Selsoviet of Sevsky District

Kaluga Oblast
As of 2010, one rural locality in Kaluga Oblast bears this name:
Borisovsky, Kaluga Oblast, a settlement in Kuybyshevsky District

Kostroma Oblast
As of 2010, two rural localities in Kostroma Oblast bear this name:
Borisovskoye, Galichsky District, Kostroma Oblast, a village in Dmitriyevskoye Settlement of Galichsky District
Borisovskoye, Soligalichsky District, Kostroma Oblast, a village in Soligalichskoye Settlement of Soligalichsky District

Krasnodar Krai
As of 2010, one rural locality in Krasnodar Krai bears this name:
Borisovsky, Krasnodar Krai, a khutor in Kiyevsky Rural Okrug of Krymsky District

Moscow Oblast
As of 2010, one rural locality in Moscow Oblast bears this name:
Borisovskoye, Moscow Oblast, a village in Provodnikovskoye Rural Settlement of Kolomensky District

Nizhny Novgorod Oblast
As of 2010, one rural locality in Nizhny Novgorod Oblast bears this name:
Borisovsky, Nizhny Novgorod Oblast, a settlement in Vasilevo-Maydansky Selsoviet of Pochinkovsky District

Novosibirsk Oblast
As of 2010, one rural locality in Novosibirsk Oblast bears this name:
Borisovsky, Novosibirsk Oblast, a settlement in Ordynsky District

Omsk Oblast
As of 2010, one rural locality in Omsk Oblast bears this name:
Borisovskoye, Omsk Oblast, a selo in Borisovsky Rural Okrug of Sherbakulsky District

Ryazan Oblast
As of 2010, one rural locality in Ryazan Oblast bears this name:
Borisovskoye, Ryazan Oblast, a selo in Komsomolsky Rural Okrug of Rybnovsky District

Sverdlovsk Oblast
As of 2010, one rural locality in Sverdlovsk Oblast bears this name:
Borisovsky, Sverdlovsk Oblast, a settlement under the administrative jurisdiction of the City of Nizhnyaya Tura

Tver Oblast
As of 2010, three rural localities in Tver Oblast bear this name:
Borisovsky, Tver Oblast, a settlement in Vyshnevolotsky District
Borisovskoye, Kesovogorsky District, Tver Oblast, a selo in Kesovogorsky District
Borisovskoye, Lesnoy District, Tver Oblast, a selo in Lesnoy District

Vladimir Oblast
As of 2010, one rural locality in Vladimir Oblast bears this name:
Borisovskoye, Vladimir Oblast, a selo in Suzdalsky District

Volgograd Oblast
As of 2010, one rural locality in Volgograd Oblast bears this name:
Borisovsky, Volgograd Oblast, a khutor in Staroanninsky Selsoviet of Novoanninsky District

Vologda Oblast
As of 2010, five rural localities in Vologda Oblast bear this name:
Borisovskaya, Kharovsky District, Vologda Oblast, a village in Shapshinsky Selsoviet of Kharovsky District
Borisovskaya, Kirillovsky District, Vologda Oblast, a village in Ferapontovsky Selsoviet of Kirillovsky District
Borisovskaya, Syamzhensky District, Vologda Oblast, a village in Korobitsinsky Selsoviet of Syamzhensky District
Borisovskaya, Tarnogsky District, Vologda Oblast, a village in Verkhnekokshengsky Selsoviet of Tarnogsky District
Borisovskaya, Verkhovazhsky District, Vologda Oblast, a village in Naumovsky Selsoviet of Verkhovazhsky District

Yaroslavl Oblast
As of 2010, nine rural localities in Yaroslavl Oblast bear this name:
Borisovskoye, Bolsheselsky District, Yaroslavl Oblast, a village in Blagoveshchensky Rural Okrug of Bolsheselsky District
Borisovskoye, Borisoglebsky District, Yaroslavl Oblast, a selo in Ramensky Rural Okrug of Borisoglebsky District
Borisovskoye, Lyubimsky District, Yaroslavl Oblast, a village in Osetsky Rural Okrug of Lyubimsky District
Borisovskoye, Rostovsky District, Yaroslavl Oblast, a village in Sulostsky Rural Okrug of Rostovsky District
Borisovskoye, Rybinsky District, Yaroslavl Oblast, a village in Mikhaylovsky Rural Okrug of Rybinsky District
Borisovskoye, Tutayevsky District, Yaroslavl Oblast, a village in Fominsky Rural Okrug of Tutayevsky District
Borisovskoye, Uglichsky District, Yaroslavl Oblast, a village in Ilyinsky Rural Okrug of Uglichsky District
Borisovskaya, Myshkinsky District, Yaroslavl Oblast, a village in Arkhangelsky Rural Okrug of Myshkinsky District
Borisovskaya, Nekrasovsky District, Yaroslavl Oblast, a village in Rodyukinsky Rural Okrug of Nekrasovsky District